Statistics of the Scottish Football League in season 1893–94.

Overview
Celtic became Scottish Division One champions. Renton were relegated, Dundee and Leith Athletic re-elected to Division One.

Clyde were elected to Division One, Hibernian and Cowlairs remained in the Scottish Division Two.
Port Glasgow Athletic were docked seven points for fielding an ineligible player.

Scottish League Division One

Scottish League Division Two

See also
1893–94 in Scottish football

 
1893-94